Mustapha Achab (born 29 September 1969) is a Moroccan footballer. He competed in the 1992 Summer Olympics.

References

1969 births
Living people
Footballers at the 1992 Summer Olympics
Moroccan footballers
Olympic footballers of Morocco
Competitors at the 1991 Mediterranean Games
Mediterranean Games bronze medalists for Morocco
Footballers from Casablanca
Association football goalkeepers
Mediterranean Games medalists in football